Tokyo is one of Japan's leading jurisdictions when it comes to civil rights for lesbian, gay, bisexual and transgender (LGBT) people. Jurisdictions in Tokyo were among the first to establish partnership registries for same-sex couples, and Tokyo became the tenth prefecture-level government to establish a registry in November 2022. Previously in 2018, Tokyo became the first prefecture-level government to enact an LGBT-inclusive human rights law protecting against discrimination and hate speech.

Recognition of same-sex unions

Municipal partnership registries 
On April 1, 2015, Shibuya in central Tokyo announced it would offer same-sex couples special "partnership certificates" ((), also known as "partnership certification system"). While these licenses are not legally recognized as marriage certificates, they may be used in civil matters such as hospital visitation rights and housing. The Shibuya city office began accepting applications on 28 October 2015. In response to this action by the Shibuya city office, the "Special Committee to Protect Family Ties" of the federal ruling Liberal Democratic Party was formed in March 2015 to discuss the matter. An officer from the Ministry of Justice who was invited to comment stated that the action by Shibuya is legal because the certificate issued is not a marriage certificate and the current Japanese legal code does not prohibit the "partnership" of same-sex couples. In July 2015, Setagaya announced it would be joining Shibuya in issuing partnership certificates from 5 November.

in May 2021, 12 municipalities in Tokyo, Adachi, Bunkyō, Edogawa, Fuchū, Koganei, Kokubunji, Kunitachi, Minato, Nakano, Setagaya, Shibuya and Toshima, agreed to mutually recognize each others' partnership certificates. Other wards, including Tama, Kita, Musashino and Arakawa, have established registries since, with the city of Machida set to launch a registry in March 2023.

As of June 2022, 604 same-sex partnerships had been registered within Tokyo's cities and wards.

Prefectural-level partnership registry 
On 7 June 2021, the General Affairs Committee of the Tokyo Metropolitan Assembly unanimously accepted a petition, launched by LGBT activists and signed by 18,000 people, to establish a partnership system in Tokyo Metropolis. Governor Yuriko Koike expressed her support for the move, stating it would "respect the human rights of sexual minorities and promote the understanding of Tokyo citizens regarding diversity". The bill, establishing the "Tokyo Partnership Oath System" was enacted by the Metropolitan Assembly on 15 June 2022. It calls on businesses and other entities to treat same-sex partnerships as equal to married couples, allowing couples to access family-use housing, the right to visit their partners in hospital, and to respect children designated as members of the household. At least one partner must be resident in Tokyo or a commuter for work. It came into force on 1 November, with applications being accepted from 10 October, making Tokyo the tenth and most-populous prefecture to do so. By 31 December 2022, 407 certificates had been issued by the prefecture. The Metropolitan Government also completed a mutual recognition agreement with those cities and wards in Tokyo which had already established their own registries since 2015, ensuring that partnerships registered by these cities since would be recognized and affirmed throughout all of Tokyo's cities and wards. The government has yet to extend mutual recognition to other prefectures' registries.

Same-sex marriage litigation

2020 Tokyo High Court ruling 
A lawsuit was filed by a Tokyo couple on 14 February (Valentine's Day), 2019, and was among several such lawsuits filed that day in other jurisdictions. The plaintiffs, Chizuka Oe and Yoko Ogawa, a couple for 25 years, argued that banning same-sex marriage violates articles 13 and 14 of the Constitution.

On 4 March 2020, the Tokyo High Court ruled that cohabiting same-sex couples should be entitled to the same legal benefits as those granted to cohabiting heterosexual couples. This ruling provided legitimacy to the plaintiff's same-sex relationship, allowing the plaintiff to sue her lesbian partner of seven years for infidelity, a move that was previously restricted to heterosexual partners. The decision was upheld by the Supreme Court of Japan on 18 March 2021.

Adoption and family planning 
Same-sex couples are not allowed to legally adopt in Japan. Lesbian couples and single women are unable to access IVF and artificial insemination.

In April 2021, Adachi became the first ward in Tokyo to establish a "partnership family system" (パートナーシップ・ファミリーシップ制度, pātonāshippu famirīshippu seido), an extension of the partnership oath system which also recognises the children of same-sex couples, and allows partners to make medical decisions for their child, and to pick up their children at schools and kindergartens (whereas previously only the biological parent was allowed to pick up the child). Setagaya reformed their existing partnership system in November 2022 to include the designation of partners' children.  

Tokyo's prefectural partnership certificates are designed to allow the inclusion of the names of children within the partnerships. The range of same-sex partners' rights and responsibilities for children in the family has yet to be formally determined.

Discrimination protections and hate crime law 

In October 2018, the Tokyo Metropolitan Assembly passed a law prohibiting all discrimination on the basis of sexual orientation and gender identity, including in employment. The law, which took effect in April 2019, also commits the Metropolitan Government to raise awareness of LGBT people and "conduct measures needed to make sure human rights values are rooted in all corners of the city". The law outlaws expressing hateful rhetoric in public. Prior to this, the wards of Shibuya and Setagaya (March 2018) had already passed explicit protections for LGBT people.

In 1990, the group OCCUR (Japan Association for the Lesbian and Gay Movement) won a court case against a Tokyo government policy that barred gay and lesbian youth from using the "Metropolitan House for Youth". While the court ruling does not seem to have extended to other areas of government-sponsored discrimination, it is cited by the courts as a civil rights case.

LGBT life

Politics 
Several milestones in LGBT political history have taken place in Tokyo Metropolis. 

In 2003, Aya Kamikawa became the first openly transgender politician to be elected to public office in Japan, winning a seat on the Setagaya Ward Assembly. She initially ran as an independent but expressed support for the now-defunct Rainbow and Greens party and later unsuccessfully ran for the National Parliament as a member of the Democratic Party of Japan.

In 2010, Tokyo Governor Shintaro Ishihara faced international criticism for controversial comments he made, in which he said that gays and lesbians were "deficient somehow. It may be attributed to something genetic. I feel sorry for them being a minority."

In 2011, Taiga Ishikawa became one of the first two openly-gay men elected to office in Japan, winning a seat in the local assembly of Toshima Ward. He came out publicly in his book Where Is My Boyfriend (2002), and started a non-profit organization that sponsors social events for gay men in Japan. Wataru Ishizaka, also openly gay, was elected in the same election to the Nakano ward council in Tokyo.

At the 2019 House of Councillors election, Ishikawa won a seat in the House of Councillors as a member of the CDP, the first openly gay man to do so. After his election, he vowed to legalize same-sex marriage and enact anti-discrimination laws within the six years of his term.

During the country's 2017 general election, Tokyo Governor Yuriko Koike's newly launched Party of Hope pledged the elimination of LGBT discrimination in its manifesto.

References

External links 

 Tokyo Partnership Oath System User Guide (in English PDF), Tokyo Metropolitan Government

Human rights in Japan
LGBT rights in Japan
Japanese culture by prefecture
Politics of Tokyo
LGBT culture in Tokyo